Patrick Wilson is a New Zealand actor, best known for his role as "Arthur Short" in Rude Awakenings, opposite Danielle Cormack.

He served as an officer in the New Zealand Police before attending classes at the Actors Institute of London and LAMDA. He has appeared in Mercy Peak and Shortland Street. He had a supporting role in the 2008 film Second Hand Wedding.

Filmography

Films

Television

References

External links

TVNZ profile

Living people
New Zealand police officers
New Zealand male film actors
New Zealand male television actors
Place of birth missing (living people)
Year of birth missing (living people)